Juan Gómez González (10 November 1954 – 2 April 1992), known as Juanito, was a Spanish footballer who played as a forward.

A player with tremendous dribbling ability whose career was overshadowed by a fierce character, he was best known for his Real Madrid years. He died in a road accident at the age of 37.

Growing up he supported Real Zaragoza, but as he approached his adulthood he began supporting Real Madrid. Upon his presentation in 1977, he said: "Playing for Real Madrid is like touching the sky, Real Madrid has always been my first choice as a team and Madrid has always been my favorite as a city". Over 13 seasons, he amassed La Liga totals of 350 matches and 99 goals.

Juanito earned more than 30 caps for Spain, representing the nation in two World Cups and one European Championship.

Club career
Born in Fuengirola, Province of Málaga, Juanito played as a youth with his local club before joining Atlético Madrid in 1969. While still underage, he allegedly forged his papers so he could play for their under-18 team. He scored twice on his debut, but a fractured tibia ended his career at Atlético and he never played for the senior side.

Juanito would revive his career at Burgos CF, helping them win the Segunda División in 1975–76. He made his La Liga debut in a 2–1 win over RCD Español in the following season, and was eventually awarded Spanish Footballer of the Year by Don Balón.

Juanito soon attracted the attention of Real Madrid, which signed the player in June 1977. He became a prominent member of the successful sides during the late 1970s and 1980s, in a squad which also featured Santillana, Uli Stielike, Vicente del Bosque and José Antonio Camacho. Having scored ten goals in his debut season he was instrumental in helping the capital team to five league titles, two Copa del Rey and two UEFA Cups – among his personal highlights were netting twice in the 1980 domestic cup final, incidentally played against Castilla CF, the club's reserves (6–1). On 11 May 1983 he scored through a penalty in the European Cup Winners' Cup final, a 2–1 loss against Aberdeen, and, in the subsequent league campaign, he won the Pichichi Trophy after finishing as joint top scorer with 17 goals; over ten seasons with the Merengues he played 284 top-flight games and scored 85 times, adding 55 appearances in various European competitions (17 goals).

After leaving Real Madrid, Juanito spent two seasons with CD Málaga, helping the side promote from the second tier in his first year, as champions – as legendary László Kubala was the manager– and scoring one of his five goals of the following campaign against former teammate Francisco Buyo, before retiring in 1991 after a very brief spell with amateurs CD Los Boliches, also in his native Andalusia. He subsequently began a working as a coach with CP Mérida, leading the team to a seventh place in division two in 1991–92; however, on 2 April 1992, after watching Real play Torino F.C. in a UEFA Cup match, he was killed in a road accident in Calzada de Oropesa, Toledo, while returning to Mérida.

International career
Juanito played 34 times for Spain, scoring eight goals. His debut came on 10 October 1976 in a 1978 FIFA World Cup qualifier against Yugoslavia, in Sevilla: at the 30-minute mark, he replaced teammate del Bosque in a 2–0 win; in the second match with this opponent, on 30 November 1977 in Belgrade (1–0 victory), he was hit with a bottle as he was being replaced and made an obscene gesture towards the crowd.

Juanito represented Spain at the 1978 and 1982 World Cups, and at UEFA Euro 1980. During the 1982 competition, on home soil, he netted a penalty against Yugoslavia in another win (2–1). In 1976, he played Olympic football.

Profile
Juanito was considered by most of Real Madrid fans to represent the essence of what the club is about, his spirit often being called upon before matches where the team need to make an unexpected comeback (because of all the comebacks he often led while donning the white shirt). One of these was against Celtic in the quarter-finals of the 1979–80 European Cup, with Real losing 2–0 in the first match in Glasgow: in the second leg the team managed to come from behind after scoring three times without response (the third by him), thus reaching the last four; other comebacks in this period included the downings of Inter Milan and R.S.C. Anderlecht.

Since his death, Juanito continued to be remembered in the seventh minute of every home game, as the Ultras chanted "Illa illa illa, Juanito maravilla".

During his career, Juanito was involved in several violent incidents: in 1978, he received a two-year suspension from European competitions after assaulting referee Adolf Prokop in a match against Grasshopper Club Zürich. In a UEFA Cup tie against another Swiss side, Neuchâtel Xamax FCS, he spat on former teammate Stielike. He was again banned in 1987, this time for four years – an error in communications from UEFA meant that the sanction was originally thought to be five – after deliberately stamping on FC Bayern Munich's Lothar Matthäus' face.

Career statistics
Scores and results list Spain's goal tally first, score column indicates score after each Juanito goal.

Honours
Real Madrid
La Liga: 1977–78, 1978–79, 1979–80, 1985–86, 1986–87
Copa del Rey: 1979–80, 1981–82
Copa de la Liga: 1985
UEFA Cup: 1984–85, 1985–86

Burgos
Segunda División: 1975–76

Málaga
Segunda División: 1987–88

Individual
Don Balón Award – Best Spanish Player: 1976–77
Pichichi Trophy: 1983–84

References

External links

Stats at Amigos Malaguistas 

1954 births
1992 deaths
People from Fuengirola
Sportspeople from the Province of Málaga
Spanish footballers
Footballers from Andalusia
Association football forwards
La Liga players
Segunda División players
Segunda División B players
CD Fuengirola players
Atlético Madrid B players
Burgos CF (1936) footballers
Real Madrid CF players
CD Málaga footballers
UEFA Cup winning players
Spain youth international footballers
Spain amateur international footballers
Spain international footballers
1978 FIFA World Cup players
UEFA Euro 1980 players
1982 FIFA World Cup players
Olympic footballers of Spain
Footballers at the 1976 Summer Olympics
Pichichi Trophy winners
Spanish football managers
Segunda División managers
CP Mérida managers
Road incident deaths in Spain